Albert Wesley "Bud" Ellor (1905 – February 11, 1932) was an American professional football player who spent one season in the National Football League with the Newark Tornadoes in 1930. Ellor appeared in all 12 games the team played, starting six of them.

Born in Bloomfield, New Jersey, Ellor attended Bloomfield High School and played for the Bucknell Bison football team.

References

1905 births
1932 deaths
Bloomfield High School (New Jersey) alumni
Bucknell Bison football players
Newark Tornadoes players
People from Bloomfield, New Jersey
Players of American football from New Jersey
Sportspeople from Essex County, New Jersey
Accidental deaths from falls
Accidental deaths in New Jersey